Red Claw may refer to:

 Australian red claw crayfish
 Red Claw (novel), a 2009 science fiction novel by Philip Palmer
 "Red Claw", a 2014 dubstep song from Aleksander Vinter's album Orakel
 Red Claw, a fictional character in The Land Before Time series
Red Claw, a fictional character in Batman: The Animated Series
Red Claw, a fictional organization in Arthur
 Maine Red Claws, an NBA D-League basketball team affiliated to the NBA Boston Celtics